Cheng Te-mei is a general officer of the Republic of China Army (ROCA) in Taiwan. Born in Taiwan with Hainanese parents. He was the Vice Minister (Armaments) of National Defense, having served in this capacity from 1 November 2015 to 28 April 2017.

References

Living people
Republic of China Army generals
1955 births